Lewis Carroll's books Alice's Adventures in Wonderland (1865) and Through the Looking-Glass (1871) have been highly popular in their original forms, and have served as the basis for many subsequent works since they were published. They have been adapted directly into other media, their characters and situations have been appropriated into other works, and these elements have been referenced innumerable times as familiar elements of shared culture. Simple references to the two books are too numerous to list; this list of works based on Alice in Wonderland focuses on works based specifically and substantially on Carroll's two books about the character of Alice.

Carolyn Sigler has shown that Carroll's two great fantasies inspired dozens of imitations, responses, and parodies during the remainder of the nineteenth century and the first part of the twentieth — so many that Carroll at one point began his own collection of Alice imitations. In 1887, one critic even suggested that Carroll had plagiarized Tom Hood's From Nowhere to the North Pole (1875) when writing Alice — although Hood's work came out ten years after Alice and was one of its many imitations.

In 1907, copyright on Alice's Adventures in Wonderland expired in the UK, entering the tale into the public domain. The primary wave of Alice-inspired works slackened after about 1920, though Carroll's influence on other writers has never fully waned.

Literature and publications

Literary retellings and sequels
 1890 – The Nursery "Alice" by Lewis Carroll himself, a short version of the story written for little children.
 1895 – A New Alice in the Old Wonderland, a novel by Anna M. Richards in which a different Alice, Alice Lee, travels to Wonderland and meets many of the characters of Carroll's books as well as others. (New edition 2009)
 c1897 – Gladys in Grammarland, a parody by Audrey Mayhew Allen illustrated by Henry Clarence Pitz in which a recalcitrant schoolgirl meets many grammar Imps which help to educate her. (New edition 2010)
 1902 – The Westminster Alice, a parody by "Saki"  illustrated by Francis Carruthers Gould critical of the Second Boer War in which Alice meets many British politicians of the time. (New edition 2010)
 1902 – Clara in Blunderland, a parody by "Caroline Lewis" critical of the Second Boer War in which Clara represents Leader of the House of Commons Arthur Balfour.  (New edition 2010)
 1903 – Lost in Blunderland, a sequel to Clara in Blunderland criticizing Arthur Balfour after he was made Prime Minister. (New edition 2010)
 1904 – John Bull's Adventures in the Fiscal Wonderland, a parody by Charles Geake and Francis Carruthers Gould critical of British economic policies of the time, in which the part of Alice is played by John Bull. (New edition 2010)
 1907 – Alice in Blunderland: An Iridescent Dream, a parody by American humourist John Kendrick Bangs making fun of big business and big government. (New edition 2010)
 1917 - New Adventures of Alice by artist John Rae, in which a young girl called Betsey dreams in bed about finding a new Alice book she had longed for since she read the first two and from there. The story follows Alice as she goes on another deep sleep adventure encountering characters and scenarios mostly based on the Mother Goose Rhymes. (New edition 2010)
 1923 – Alice in Grammarland, a play by Louise Franklin Bache and illustrated by  "Claudine", in which Alice attends a courtroom scene in Grammarland where questions of grammar are discussed. (New edition 2010)
 1925 - Alice in Orchestralia by Ernest La Prade has another girl named Alice meeting animated musical instruments and learning about the symphony orchestra. A second edition was issued in 1934 under the title Alice in Orchestra-Land. 
 1984 – Alice Through the Needle's Eye by Gilbert Adair, a sequel to Carroll's Alice books. (New edition 2012)
 1996 – Automated Alice by Jeff Noon. In this illustrated novella, Alice enters a grandfather clock and emerges in future Manchester, which has many bizarre denizens including an invisible cat named Quark and Celia, the Automated Alice.
 1998 – Otherland by Tad Williams, a science fiction series heavily influenced by Alice. There are sections involving a Red Queen, the chess-squares concept from Looking Glass, and evil men following the protagonists who take the form of Tweedledum and Tweedledee several times. There are four volumes in this series: City of Golden Shadow (Hardcover 1996, Paperback 1998); River of Blue Fire (Hardcover 1998, Paperback 1999); Mountain of Black Glass (Hardcover 1999, Paperback 2000); Sea of Silver Light (Hardcover 2001, Paperback 2002)
 2006 – The Looking Glass Wars, and its follow-up novel, Seeing Redd (2007), written by Frank Beddor, depict an alternative to Carroll's Alice, implying that Carroll in fact distorted the story of Princess Alyss Heart (a.k.a. Alice Liddell) who had been sent to Earth when the evil Queen Redd conquered Wonderland. The series follows Alyss' exploits with familiar characters cast in new roles. The third book in the trilogy, ArchEnemy, was published in October 2009.
 2007 - Alice in Sunderland is a graphic novel by comics writer and artist Bryan Talbot. It explores the links between Lewis Carroll and the Sunderland area, with wider themes of history, myth and storytelling — and the truth about what happened to Sid James on stage at the Sunderland Empire Theatre.
 2009 – Wonderland Revisited and the Games Alice Played There, a novel by Keith Sheppard, in which Alice finds herself back in Wonderland and has a number of a boardgame-themed adventures.
 2010 – Alice in Verse: The Lost Rhymes of Wonderland, by J.T. Holden, is a reimagining of Lewis Carroll's classic tales, written entirely in rhyming verse. (Hardcover)
 2013 – Splintered, by A. G. Howard, a novel about a descendant of Alice Liddel, Alyssa Gardner, who finds out the truth about the dark secrets of Wonderland.
 2015 – The Chronicles of Alice horror trilogy by Christina Henry Alice (2015), Red Queen (2016), Looking Glass  (2020)
 2015 – After Alice by Gregory Maguire
 2015 - Alice's Nightmare in Wonderland (2015, Snowbooks)
 2016 - Heartless by Marissa Meyer, in which readers get a better understanding of how the Queen of Hearts became the heartless, white rose-despising tyrant she is in Carroll's Wonderland.
 2017 – The Secret Way of Alice by Travis Arias, is an introduction to the process of spiritual development in the form of commentaries and explanations of the ideas, symbols and characters found in Lewis Carroll's “Alice´s Adventures in Wonderland”.
 2017- Alice Returns a sequel by Nayantara Ghosh, in which Alice returns to wonderland 10 years after her first visit, along with the White Rabbit and Cheshire Cat to save the Queen Of Hearts from her childhood friend-turned enemy, Ivy, who hopes to destroy Wonderland. The story was written by the author when she was eleven years old.
 2018- A Blade So Black by L.L. McKinney is a modern retelling that imagines Alice as a black teenage girl from Atlanta. McKinney uses Wonderland and the creatures that dwell within it to explore themes of nightmares, fears, and generational trauma. 
 2021 - Alice's Adventures under Water, a sequel by Lenny de Rooy in which Alice falls into a lake and enters an under-water world. The book is written in Lewis Carroll's style, and contains many new puns, poems and parodies. It also has different layers of hidden references, like the original books.

Literature containing allusions and influences

Davy and the Goblin; or, What Followed Reading "Alice's Adventures in Wonderland" (1884) by Charles E. Carryl. (New edition 2011)
The Admiral's Caravan" (1892) by Charles E. Carryl. (New edition 2011)
 Finnegans Wake (1939) by James Joyce is famously influenced by Alice. The novel is about a dream, and includes such lines as: "Alicious, twinstreams twinestraines, through alluring glass or alas in jumboland?" and "... Wonderlawn's lost us for ever. Alis, alas, she broke the glass! Liddell lokker through the leafery, ours is mistery of pain."
French philosopher Gilles Deleuze writes extensively on Alice in Wonderland and the paradoxes contained within it in The Logic of Sense (1969).
 Douglas Hofstadter's Gödel, Escher, Bach (1979) contains numerous references to Alice in Wonderland.
 Mordant's Need (1986–1987) is a two-volume fantasy book series by Stephen R. Donaldson, which tells the story of a woman named Terisa who travels from modern Earth to a medieval setting where there is a form of magic based on mirrors. Instead of reflecting images, mirrors are used to "translate" people and things between locations and realities. The author also bases much of the plot on a metaphor of the game of checkers (called "hop-board" in the story) instead of chess.
 Paul Auster's City of Glass (1987) contains a reference to Chapter IV: Humpty Dumpty of Through the Looking-Glass.
Stasiland (2003) written by Anna Funder is a non-fiction text which explores the regime of the German secret police and the Berlin wall. There are many allusions to Alice throughout the text.
The King in the Window (2005) by Adam Gopnik.
 The first novel in the Echo Falls series by Peter Abrahams, called Down the Rabbit Hole (2006), features main character Ingrid Levin-Hill starring in a stage production of Alice's Adventures in Wonderland.
 White Rabbit Chronicles (2012 - 2019) is a series by Gena Showalter. Set in a modern day world of zombies and zombie killers, the series plays off of the themes of Alice's Adventures in Wonderland throughout all four books, including the titular character Alice Bell. 
 The Wonderland Gambit is a trilogy by Jack Chalker.  While set in a science-esque setting, the trilogy plays heavily on both characters and themes from the Lewis Carroll books.
 Alice Liddell is a character in the Riverworld series of science fiction books by Philip José Farmer.
The eleventh book of A Series of Unfortunate Events, by Lemony Snicket (the nom de plume of American author Daniel Handler), contains a poem - "The Walrus and the Carpenter" - which contains a stanza worded in a coded message. The book also features a beach named Briny Beach.
 Vladimir Nabokov translated Alice into his native Russian as Аня в Стране Чудес (Anya in Wonderland). His novels include many Carrollian allusions, such as the spoof book titles that run through Ada, or Ardor. However, Nabokov told his student and annotator Alfred Appel that the infamous Lolita, with its paedophilic protagonist, makes no conscious allusions to Carroll (despite the novel's photography theme and Carroll's interest in the art form).
 British writer Jeff Noon has inserted many Carrollian allusions into a series of cyberpunk novels, beginning with Vurt (1993), that are set in a fantasy-future Manchester. In the books, Noon applies a logical extension of the Wonderland and Looking-Glass World concepts into a virtual reality cyberverse that characters occasionally get lost in. One possible interpretation of the books is that everything happens in the dream of Alice, akin to the supposed "dream of the Red King" in Through the Looking-Glass. Noon also wrote Automated Alice, which he calls a "trequel" to the Alice books as well as being a continuation of the Vurt series.
 Carroll's work is a major subtext in Joyce Carol Oates' novel Wonderland.
John Ringo's Looking Glass military hard science fiction book series, Into the Looking Glass, Vorpal Blade, Manxome Foe, and Claws That Catch.
 HaJaBaRaLa, a Bengali "nonsense story" by Sukumar Ray, features a little boy who enters into a fantasy world full of fantastic comic creatures.
 The title of the teen novel Go Ask Alice (author said to be Beatrice Sparks), is taken from the psychedelic song by Jefferson Airplane, "White Rabbit", which took major imagery from Alice's Adventures in Wonderland.
 Sign of Chaos, written by Roger Zelazny as part of The Chronicles of Amber, features two chapters taking place in a manufactured Shadow designed to resemble Wonderland as part of a drug-induced hallucination.
 A Wonderlandiful World, the third book in the Ever After High series of novels, features the Jabberwock as its primary antagonist.

Comics, manga, and graphic novels
Several Batman villains are based on characters from the books: 
The Mad Hatter dresses like the Carroll character and often quotes from the books. 
Tweedledum and Tweedledee are named for the characters in Through the Looking Glass. 
The graphic novel, Arkham Asylum: A Serious House on Serious Earth, itself loosely based on Alice's Adventures in Wonderland, features numerous direct quotes from (and references to) Carroll and his books.
Heart no Kuni no Alice (Alice in the Country of Hearts), written by Quin Rose, is a manga series based on Alice in Wonderland.
Alan Moore's comic, The League of Extraordinary Gentlemen, Volume II, contains a section called "The New Traveller's Almanac". The almanac contains reports about investigations of various strange locations and phenomena well known from fiction, including a thinly-veiled discussion of Alice on p. 28, in which it is revealed that after returning from her adventures through the looking-glass her organs were all on the wrong side of her body and she was no longer able to digest normal food.
Alan Moore also included teenage and adult versions of Alice as characters in his erotic graphic novel, Lost Girls.
 Another Japanese manga series, called Pandora Hearts, contains heavy references to Alice in Wonderland. The main character is Oz Vessalius, who finds the mysterious girl Alice and eventually begins fighting against and among Chains (creatures from a certain dimension known as the Abyss), whose names are taken directly from the book (Mad Hatter, March Hare, etc.), in order to regain her lost memories. There was also an omake between chapters 44 and 45 called "Gil in Wonderland", which parodies the beginning of Alice in Wonderland. Gilbert, another character from the series, takes the place of Alice and falls down a rabbit hole.
In 2008, Disney Press and Slave Labor Graphics released a graphic novel called Wonderland about the White Rabbit's housemaid, Mary Ann. It is written by Tommy Kovac and illustrated by Sonny Liew.
An issue of the comic book series Marvel Fairy Tales is a basic retelling of Alice in Wonderland, with the superheroine Stature playing the role of Alice. There are also Wonderland versions of her fellow Young Avengers along with her father Scott Lang and Tigra (as the Cheshire Cat).
In the anime series Kyousogiga, the protagonist enters the "mirror capital" in search of a black rabbit. The ONA preceding the show begins with the poem A Boat Beneath a Sunny Sky from Through the Looking-Glass.
Alice in Murderland, a manga series by Kaori Yuki
A Japanese manga series, called Alice in Borderland was released in 2014. The manga also takes names of characters from the original story as nicknames of the manga characters. The main characters, Arisu, Karube, and Chōta, are transported into a seemingly post-apocalyptic-like parallel world. After stepping into what seems to be an empty festival, they are greeted by a woman who tells them that they have been taken to a world called "Borderland" and must now participate in deadly games. A 3-episode original video animation (OVA) was released in 2014 to 2015 and a Netflix live-action adaptation series was released in 2020.
 One of The Simpsons comic books contains a parody called "Lisa's Adventures in Wordland", in which Lisa dreams about visiting a world themed around the English language.
 One of the stories in a fairy-tale themed Betty and Veronica comic book is an adaptation called "Betty in Wonderland", where Betty tells the kids she babysits a story about herself and her friends in Wonderland.
 Rozen Maiden.
 Alice in Wonderland (1934–1935) was a comic strip adaptation drawn by Edward D. Kuekes and written by Olive Ray Scott. This version also featured a "topper" strip, Knurl the Gnome. The strip was distributed by United Feature Syndicate.
Walt Disney's Alice in Wonderland (1951, Dell Comics).
Walt Disney's Alice in Wonderland (1965, Gold Key Comics)
Walt Disney's Alice in Wonderland (Whitman, 1984)
"The Complete Alice in Wonderland" (2009, Dynamite Entertainment).
Return to Wonderland (2007, Zenescope Entertainment).
Alice in Wonderland (2011, Zenescope Entertainment)
Alice in Weirdworld (2020, Flying Buffalo Incorporated)
 Sakura Kinoshita's Fushigi no Kuni no Alice (2007)
 Jun Mochizuki's Pandora Hearts has numerous references to the Alice books

Film

Not to be confused with actual adaptations of the Alice and Looking-Glass books, these are films which are based on elements of the books.
 The Alice Comedies, a series of live action/animated shorts created by Walt Disney and Ub Iwerks in the 1920s which initially were loosely based on Alice in Wonderland.
 Smashing Time (1967), in which many of the characters are named after nonsense poems in Through the Looking Glass
 Alice in Wonderland: A Musical Porno, a 1976 pornographic film, is based directly upon Lewis Carroll's story.
 Alice or the Last Escapade, a 1977 French film directed by Claude Chabrol about a girl named Alice who gets into her own otherworldly adventure.
 Jabberwocky (1977) a film by Terry Gilliam set in medieval times and featuring the Jabberwock.
 Dreamchild, the 1985 Gavin Millar film, in which a reporter attempts to uncover the 'true story' of the Alice tales from an 80-year-old woman who may or may not be Alice Liddel. Featuring grotesque, aged versions of the Alice characters (designed by Jim Henson's Creature shop), the film explores the relationships adults have with the fictional characters from their childhoods.
 Resident Evil (2002) contains various references to Alice's Adventures in Wonderland.
 The Last Mimsy (2007). Science fiction tale of another young girl who gets a look into the looking glass, guided by the same rabbit as Alice.
 Phoebe in Wonderland (2008), starring Elle Fanning as a little girl whose role as Alice in a school play helps her deal with her Tourette syndrome.
 Alice (miniseries) (2009), a modern interpretation TV miniseries broadcast on Syfy
 Malice in Wonderland, set in present-day England; the characters are inspired by those in Carroll's novels.
Alice in Murderland (2010) A horror movie based on characters from Alice's Adventures In Wonderland.
 Alice in Wonderland, (2010), a film by Tim Burton, starring Johnny Depp as the Mad Hatter in which a 19-year-old Alice played by Mia Wasikowska returns to Wonderland for more adventures.
 In Marx Reloaded (2011), Karl Marx is depicted in scenes which parody both The Matrix and Alice's Adventures in Wonderland.
 Red Kingdom Rising (2014), an independent fantasy horror film inspired by Alice's Adventures in Wonderland and Through the Looking-Glass. The film uses the characters of Alice and the Red King with the concepts of dream reversal and symbolism.
 Alice Through the Looking Glass (2016), the sequel to the Burton-directed Alice in Wonderland, with Mia Wasikowska reprising her role as Alice.

Animation
Betty in Blunderland (1934), Betty Boop's adventures in Wonderland.
Thru the Mirror (1936), Mickey Mouse's adventures in a dream world inspired by reading Through the Looking-Glass (but with animated cards as in Alice in Wonderland).
Nippon Animation produced an anime of Alice in Wonderland in 1983 to 1984. This anime is an adaptation of an original story in which Alice and her rabbit Benny take a trip to Wonderland, returning home at the end of each episode.
The Care Bears Adventure in Wonderland, a 1987 film where Wonderland is visited by the Care Bears. In her depiction in this cartoon, Alice bears a resemblance to the Princess of Hearts and is used to take her place while they search for the real princess. 
Neco z Alenky (Alice) A 1988 full-length stop motion animation by Czech Republic artist Jan Švankmajer.
 Garfield and Friends had an episode called "Orson in Wonderland", in which Orson imagines himself visiting Wonderland and his friends as some of the characters.
Miyuki-chan in Wonderland (1993), an anime, adapted from a manga by Clamp, is an erotic lesbian rendition of Alice.
Mindy in Wonderland (November 1996), Animaniacs cartoon
Project ARMS (プロジェクトアームズ? Puroziĕkutoāmuzu) (1997) is a manga/anime series that is heavily influenced by "Alice's Adventures in Wonderland". The ARMS weapons are named after characters in Lewis Carroll's Alice in Wonderland.
Alice SOS (April 1998), where four kids go on an adventure to different worlds to rescue Alice after she has been kidnapped by a mysterious evil horse.
Serial Experiments Lain (July 1998) tells the story of a girl who is drawn into the cyberspace "underground" of the Wired, and features a character named Arisu ("Alice") Mizuki (this character is a second use of one created by the scenarist, Chiaki Konaka, for the animation "Alice in Cyberland").
Cardcaptor Sakura has two episodes in the anime adaptation that refer to the Alice stories:
"Sakura's Little Adventure" (October 1998) subtly references Alice's Adventures in Wonderland as Sakura is shrunken by the Clow Card called The Little and wears a dress resembling the one worn by Alice in the original illustrations and the 1951 Disney movie.
"Sakura in Wonderland" (1999) is more clearly based on the Alice stories.  Sakura portrays Alice while the supporting characters in the anime series portray several other characters in the Alice stories.
Gakuen Alice (2003) is about a school where people's unique abilities are called "Alices". The currency used is a "rabbit". In the anime adaptation, the main character Mikan is dressed in Alice's Disney-recognized blue dress and wandering through Wonderland in the opening credits.
Kagihime Monogatari Eikyuu Alice Rondo (February 2004), a manga turned anime that focuses on the completion of a fictional sequel called The Eternal Alice.
Brandy & Mr. Whiskers (August 21, 2004) is somewhat similar to the Alice books; the main heroine falls into the Amazon because of a white rabbit, and encounters creatures like bickering twins and a tyrannical dictator.
Pandora Hearts is a 2006 manga (with 2009 anime) about a boy, Oz, who gets banished into the prison known as the "Abyss", and is saved by a "Chain" known as Alice. The mystery begins as Oz unravels the secrets behind Alice's lost memories, his own mysterious past, the Abyss and the strange organization known as Pandora. It heavily references Carroll's Alice books.
Eleanor's Secret (2009; original French title: Kérity la maison des contes), is an animated film about a boy who inherits a library of fairy tale books; the characters come out of the books and talk to the boy and they go together on an adventure. Alice and White Rabbit are among the most prominently featured characters and sections from the book are read aloud in several languages in the film.
Black Butler (or kuroshitsuji) is a Japanese anime, with original story by Yana Toboso. There was a TV series titled Ciel in Wonderland based on Alice in Wonderland. It was about Ciel Phantomhive who followed his butler, Sebastian, after noticing bunny ears and tail appearing on him, to a place called "Wonderland". He was trying to find the "white rabbit", which is actually Sebastian, but while at it, there were some people in his way and took him longer to find the white rabbit. Everyone there called him "Alice".
Code Geass is a Japanese anime which had an OVA based on Alice in Wonderland called "Nunnally in Wonderland". The story resolves about the main character, Lelouch, wishing to please his sister Nunnally. To do that he uses his power to hypnotize all other characters into believing they're characters from the story Alice in Wonderland, his sister getting the role of Alice.
Ouran High School Host Club is a Japanese Romance and Comedy anime. In OVA episode 13. It titled "Haruhi in Wonderland!" Haruhi's dream about the day of her admission into Ouran High School becomes an illusionary Alice in a Wonderland fantasy in which the various other members of the cast take on the roles of characters from the story.
Ever After High animated TV special Way Too Wonderland revolves around the main cast's journey through Wonderland.
RWBY is a 3D animated, anime-inspired series produced by Rooster Teeth and created by Monty Oum. The series includes allusions to numerous fairy tale stories and other pre-existing tales. The show's ninth volume is heavily inspired by the Alice stories, including an in-universe tale referred to as "The Girl Who Fell Through the World", featuring a main character named Alyx. Other notable characters alluding to the Alice lore are the Red Prince, the Curious Cat, and the Jabberwalker. The volume takes place in a location known as the Ever After, alluding to Wonderland.

Television
 Alice in Wonderland (or What's a Nice Kid Like You Doing in a Place Like This?), a 1966 ABC animated comedy special very loosely based on the book, in which Hedda Hopper is caricatured (with the help of her voice) as Hedda the Mad Hatter, and both Fred Flintstone and Barney Rubble from The Flintstones played the Caterpillar.
 Lost In Space (1965–1968) in episode (1-21) "The Magic Mirror" Penny goes through a mirror and discovers another universe with a lonely little boy as its sole occupant.
 An episode of Star Trek titled "Shore Leave" features a recreated white rabbit and Alice, brought to life by a computer which can make thoughts become reality.
 Carl Sagan's television series, Cosmos: A Personal Voyage (1980), used the Mad Hatter's Tea Party to illustrate the effects of higher and higher gravity, culminating in a black hole, in Episode 9: "The Lives of the 
Stars", a segment called "Gravity in Wonderland", viewable on YouTube here.
 The Disney Channel series Adventures in Wonderland (1991–1995) is based on the first book, featuring many of the major characters. Also, Alice enters Wonderland in each episode by walking through her mirror, an allusion to the second book.
 Lost (2004–2010) is heavily influenced by Alice in Wonderland and contains many references to Alice's world. The third-season finale was also named after the second book.
 This is Wonderland (2004–2006), a Canadian legal drama/comedy which follows the main character Alice De Raey as she encounters characters ranging from the truly desperate to the bizarre, is partly inspired by the characters of the Alice books.
 Alice (2009) is a Syfy channel miniseries based on the novels, but set in the modern day, where Wonderland has evolved to today's standards and Alice as a dark-haired assertive woman instead of the blond child she is in the original.
 Warehouse 13, a Syfy channel TV series, featured an evil version of Alice during the second half of season 1. In the show, Lewis Carroll's books weren't fake, but chronicles based on Alice's adventures in Wonderland masquerading as fiction. The mirror she passed through, after enough uses, made Alice go "Mad as a Hatter", turning her into a sociopathic killer. 
 Once Upon a Time in Wonderland (2013) is an ABC channel miniseries based on the novels, a spinoff from the successful TV series "Once Upon A Time". Both series combines elements from various Disney movies and are greatly inspired by the narration of LOST, which the creators also worked on. In this version Alice gets locked in an asylum, believed to be insane after her telling of Wonderland. Her doctors aim to cure her with a treatment that will make her forget everything about Wonderland and the boyfriend she lost there. Just in the nick of time, she gets saved and transported back to Wonderland by the wisecracking Knave of Hearts and the White Rabbit. Now Alice is determined to find her love while evading the plots of Jafar and the Red Queen, all the while dealing with the whimsical dangers of Wonderland, including the mysterious Jabberwocky.
Alice in Borderland (2020)

Theatre
 Alice in Wonderland is an 1886 West End musical pantomime.
 Alice in Wonderland (1912 play)  at the Forest Theater, July 1912, in Carmel-by-the-Sea, California, adapted by director Perry Newberry.
 Wonderland: A New Alice is a 2009 musical set in New York City.
 Looking-Glass is a 1982 Off-Broadway play based on the life of Charles Dodgson, the real life name of author Lewis Carroll.NY Times Review

Art

 In 1956 Charles Blackman, after listening to an audiobook of Alice's Adventures in Wonderland, painted a series of 46 paintings of Alice with other characters from the series.
 In 1959 sculptor José de Creeft created the Alice in Wonderland sculpture, patterned on illustrations drawn by John Tenniel, that sits to the north of Conservatory Water in Central Park in Manhattan, New York City.
 In 1969, Salvador Dalí produced 12 illustrations based on Alice's Adventures in Wonderland.
 All Saints' Church, Daresbury memorialises the story in several stained glass windows.

Music

Classical music and opera
Music inspired by, referencing, or incorporating texts from the Alice books include:
Deems Taylor: orchestral work Through the Looking-Glass (1918)
Cecil Forsyth: six movement orchestral suite Alice in Wonderland (1927)
Irving Fine: choral work Three Choruses from Alice in Wonderland (1942)
David Del Tredici: An Alice Symphony (1969), Final Alice (1976), Child Alice (1980/1981), Haddock's Eyes (1986)
Carlo Forlivesi, Through the Looking-Glass (2005) for electronics. The piece is included in the CD album SILENZIOSA LUNA (ALCD 76).
Unsuk Chin: opera Alice in Wonderland (2007)
Alan John: opera Through the Looking Glass (2008)
John Craton: ballet Through the Looking-Glass (2010)
Joseph Hallman: Ballet/Dramaturgy: ALICE (2010)
 Australian composer Leon Coward's Beautiful Soup (2014) a lament for piano, string orchestra and vocal ensemble, premiered by Camerata Academica of the Antipodes.

Popular music

 Jefferson Airplane's song "White Rabbit" from their 1967 album Surrealistic Pillow mentions Alice, the Dormouse, the hookah-smoking caterpillar, the White Knight, and the Red Queen. Written by Grace Slick it shows parallels between the story and the hallucinatory effects of psychedelic drugs.
 "The Walrus and the Carpenter" inspired John Lennon to write "I Am the Walrus".
 On Aerosmith's 2001 album, Just Push Play, the song "Sunshine" talks about Alice and other characters of the book. In the music video, Steven Tyler is shown trying to protect a young, blonde Alice in the woods, along with depictions of the Red Queen, the White Rabbit, among others.
 Ambrosia's song, "Mama Frog" from their album Ambrosia, contains a narration of "jabberwok".
 The thrash metal / speed metal band Annihilator released a number of albums inspired directly and indirectly by Alice in Wonderland, the most popular being Never, Neverland and Alice in Hell.
The Birthday Massacre is a Gothic/Industrial band that includes a lot of Alice In Wonderland themes both visually and musically, including a song titled "Looking Glass".
 The Japanese band Buck-Tick released a song in 2007 titled "Alice in Wonder-Underground". The PV includes a very macabre depiction of the story, with Alice chasing her rabbit, the band periodically becoming rabbits, and the lead vocalist Atsushi Sakurai dressed as the Mad Hatter.
 The 1978 Chick Corea album, The Mad Hatter, has its music, songtitles and album title based on characters and passages from the story.
Family Force 5 performs the song "Topsy Turvy" for Tim Burton's 2010 movie Alice in Wonderland but it did not make it on the album.
 The debut album Alice's Inferno, by Spanish Gothic metal band Forever Slave, is a concept album focusing on Alice's life after her parents' death.
 Hypnogaja performs the song Looking Glass on their 2005 album Below Sunset. 
 Jewel released an album and single with the title Goodbye Alice in Wonderland.
 Avril Lavigne wrote and recorded the song "Alice" for Tim Burton's film Alice in Wonderland, which is on the soundtrack Almost Alice.
 Lisa Mitchell's song "Sometimes I Feel Like Alice" is based on Alice's experiences in Wonderland.
 Malice Mizer's 1997 Sans Retour Voyage "Derniere" ~Encoure Une Fois~ concert video was an interpretation of Alice in Wonderland by the band.
 The video for the Tom Petty song "Don't Come Around Here No More" portrays Alice, the Mad Hatter, and other Wonderland elements. Producer Dave Stewart appears as the Caterpillar.
 Neil Sedaka took Alice into the US Top 50 in 1963 with the single "Alice In Wonderland".
 Symphony X's 1998 release, Twilight in Olympus, contains "Through the Looking-Glass" – a 13-minute epic about the book.
 Tom Waits released a 2002 album titled Alice, consisting of songs that were written for a stage adaptation of Alice.
 The German Neofolk collaboration, Werkraum, has a song called "Beware the Jabberwock!" using Carroll's poem with original music on their album Early Love Music.
MONKEY MAJIK's song "Wonderland" make references to characters in the story such as "the white rabbit", the caterpillar, "royal hearts", and Tweedle-dee and Tweedle-dum.
 Kyary Pamyu Pamyu's music video for Tsukema Tsukeru is heavily influenced by Alice in Wonderland
 English singer Natalia Kills debut album Perfectionist featured a single titled "Wonderland" that makes reference to various fairy tales including 'Alice In Wonderland'. The accompanying video takes the same inspiration.
 Hatcham Social's debut album You Dig The Tunnel, I'll Hide The Soil was influenced by Alice's adventures, which references aspects in the songs such as tunnels, the scene of Alice changing in size and almost drowning in tears, anthropomorphic animals, passing through mirrors and the track Jabberwocky is a spoken word reading of Carroll's poem over a bed of music.
 The song "C'mon" by Panic! At the Disco and Fun. is Alice themed and portrays Brendan Urie, lead singer of Panic! At the Disco, as Alice and Nate Ruess, lead singer of Fun., as the Mad Hatter.
 British psychedelic rock band Boeing Duveen and The Beautiful Soup released a single in 1968 with the A-side "Jabberwock" and the B-side "Which Dreamed It". The band's name comes from Alice's Adventures in Wonderland.
 Egypt Central's song "White Rabbit", written by Skidd Mills, was released on the studio album White Rabbit (completed 2010) and to radio stations on 15 February 2011 and made available on iTunes on 1 March 2011.
Marilyn Manson described his album Eat Me, Drink Me (2007) as "[his] version of Alice in Wonderland."
 Siouxsie and the Banshees named their label inside Polydor Wonderland in 1983.
 Jerome Kern's "Alice in Wonderland," from The Girl from Utah (1914).
 "Alice in Wonderland'" by Sammy Fain and Bob Hilliard appears on the Bill Evans trio album Sunday at the Village Vanguard (1961).
AKB48's B-side song, "First Rabbit", which is later also performed by JKT48
 Violinist Lindsey Stirling released a music video called "Hold My Heart" which was inspired by Alice in Wonderland which was included in her album Brave Enough.
"Alicia en el Pais" is a song in Spanish by Argentinian musician Charly Garcia released in 1980, with reference to Argentina's military dictatorship from 1976 to 1983.
In the title track of the German power metal band Blind Guardian's album, Imaginations from the Other Side, the main character struggles to save their childhood fantasy characters, including Alice, among others.
Melanie Martinez's "Mad Hatter" song from her first album*
Lady Gaga's song "Alice" released in 2020 in the Chromatica album. It references the book starting with the chorus "My name isn't Alice, but I'll keep looking for Wonderland."
"Wonderland" by Dreamcatcher references Alice as it describes a girl with "A sky blue dress, yellow glowing hair," as well as associated characters from Wonderland.

Games

Computer and video games
In the Korean MMORPG MapleStory, an area called Root Abyss is based on Alice's Adventures in Wonderland. Alicia is a character based on Alice, and three of the four bosses are based on the characters of the novel: Von Bon is a chicken based on the White Rabbit, Pierre is a clown based on the Hatter, and the Crimson Queen is a many-faced queen based on the Queen of Hearts. Some minor NPCs in Root Abyss are also based on other characters of "Alice's Adventures in Wonderland".
Alice in Wonderland developed by Etranges Libellules. Based on the 2010 Tim Burton film.
 The 2000 Game Boy Color video game Alice in Wonderland published by Nintendo.
 Alice: An Interactive Museum (1990), a point-and-click visual novel created by the influential Japanese computer graphics designer, Haruhiko Shono. Winner of the 1991 MITI Multimedia Grand Prix Award.
 Alice in Wonderland was adapted into a computer game by Windham Classics in 1985. It is presented as a platform game involving puzzle-solving and simplistic word parsers akin to a text adventure. The game was remade later for Philips CD-I with clay animation graphics.
 American McGee's Alice is a macabre computer game which chronologically takes place following the two Alice books. Alice is awoken from a dream of Wonderland by a house fire which claimed her family and left her with serious physical and mental wounds and is receiving treatment in Rutledge Asylum, she then goes on a journey in Wonderland to restore it and by doing so restore her own mind.
 Alice: Madness Returns is a direct sequel to American McGee's Alice and features Alice, now almost an adult, that tries to tackle the unresolved psychological issues related to the death of her family. Directly related to her fractured mind, the Wonderland is destroyed and a mysterious train rampages the remains.
The 2006 mobile game Alice's Warped Wonderland (歪みの国のアリス, Yugami no kuni no Arisu, Alice in Distortion World), developed by Sunsoft as part of their "Nightmare Project" series, is a horror text adventure that is based on the story and world from Alice in Wonderland. It features sixteen-year-old Japanese high school student Ariko Katsuragi, also called "Alice", who explores Wonderland as she recovers the memories of her forgotten, tragic past. In 2015, a remake of the game, titled Alice's Warped Wonderland ~ Encore ~ (歪みの国のアリス, Yugami no kuni no Arisu~Encore~, Alice in Distortion World ~ Encore ~), was launched. On June 27, 2017, an English version of game was released by Sunsoft's U.S. subsidiary. A Nintendo Switch version of game, titled Alice's Warped Wonderland ~ REcollection (歪みの国のアリス～REcollection) was released on August 25, 2022 worldwide. A PC version will be release on Steam on September 2, 2022 and will have English, Japanese, and Traditional Chinese language options.
 The RPG Kingdom Hearts includes Alice as a plot character. Also, Disney's version of Wonderland appears as one of the first worlds.
 In the intro to the Nintendo 64 game, Chameleon Twist, a rabbit runs through a forest stating he is late for something and jumps into a tree trunk and warps to a magical world. The player's character follows the rabbit into the magical world. A sequel was made called Chameleon Twist 2 and the rabbit and the magical world are once again featured.
 The otome game Heart no Kuni no Alice and its sequels Clover no Kuni no Alice and Joker no Kuni no Alice use a story and world based on Alice in Wonderland as well as many of its characters as protagonists. The titles of the games themselves are a play on the Japanese title of Alice in Wonderland; ふしぎの国のアリス (Fushigi no Kuni no Arisu)
 In the RPG Megami Tensei series and its subsequent spin-offs, Alice is a major boss and a summon that you can obtain.
 In the PC-98 game Mystic Square of the Touhou Project, one of the boss characters is named Alice. She is inspired by the story: the background music for the Extra Stage where she appears again is titled "Alice in Wonderland", and playing cards appear as enemies; the mid-boss is a King card soldier. Alice later returns in Perfect Cherry Blossom and other games of the series.
In A Witch's Tale, several major characters and some areas are directly inspired by and even named after things from "Alice's Adventures in Wonderland", while some other areas draw from other fairy tales.
 Wonderland (1990), an illustrated text adventure by Magnetic Scrolls.

Role-playing games
Dungeonland and The Land Beyond the Magic Mirror are translations of the two books into Advanced Dungeons and Dragons terms. Written by AD&D creator Gary Gygax, they were released in the 1980s as two gaming adventures (or modules). In the game, all of Carroll's characters are translated into horrifically deadly AD&D equivalents—for example, the Cheshire Cat became a sabretooth tiger (smilodon).
Similarly, the Vorpal Sword, a magical sword that can cut through just about anything, has been a magical weapon in Dungeons and Dragons for many editions. Advanced Dungeons and Dragons also includes the Jabberwock from Jabberwocky as one of its many monsters.
An adventure module for the role-playing game Paranoia was titled Alice Through the Mirrorshades, referring to both Through the Looking-Glass and the cyberpunk genre.
Wonderland, a.k.a. JAGS Wonderland, is a role-playing game by Marco Chacon and published by Better Mousetrap Games that is based on the perspective of Alice's Adventures in Wonderland as being horrific rather than merely fanciful.
Jabberwocks were among the many monsters spawned by Chaos in the Warhammer Fantasy setting, alongside such beings as Cockatrices and Manticores. They were phased out as the editions passed, but the recent "Jabberslythe" from the Beasts of Chaos army is an obvious reference to the Jabberwock and its former presence in the Warhammer world.

Science and technology
 The Eindhoven University of Technology built the interactive ALICE installation based on the narrative Alice's Adventures in Wonderland. It addresses the western culture characteristics highlighted in the narrative. Six stages were selected and implemented as an interactive experience.
 Richard Gregory in his book Mirrors in Mind, questions why looking-glass images are right-left reversed. He explains with diagrams the reversals occurring in Carroll's Through The Looking-Glass while also pondering how a scientific phenomenon is reflected in the vocabulary of the text, dwelling on the importance of words such as "re-turning", "behind", "back".

Tourist attractions
Blackpool Illuminations has featured numerous illuminated and animated features and tableaux based on Alice's Adventures in Wonderland.
Blackpool Pleasure Beach has an Alice in Wonderland amusement park ride featuring characters from both Alice's Adventures in Wonderland and Through the Looking-Glass.
Walt Disney Parks and Resorts have several attractions based on the 1951 animated film. Among them are Alice in Wonderland, Alice's Curious Labyrinth and Mad Tea Party.
Winter Park, a ski resort in Grand County, Colorado, has several trails named after Alice in Wonderland characters, including March Hare, Jabberwocky, White Rabbit, Cheshire Cat, Tweedle Dee, Tweedle Dum, and Mock Turtle. Additionally, one chairlift in this area is a double chairlift named Looking Glass. However, the main lift to these Alice in Wonderland named trails, the Olympia Express high speed quad, is not named after an Alice in Wonderland character (although it services March Hare, White Rabbit, Jabberwocky, and Cheshire Cat).

Food

 Celebrity chef Heston Blumenthal has drawn inspiration from Alice's Adventures in Wonderland in his experimental approach to gastronomy. For one of his television programmes, he created a version of the "Drink Me" potion.  Heston Blumenthal: my new Alice in Wonderland menu - Telegraph Heston Blumenthal's 'Drink Me' Potion

See also
 Translations of Alice's Adventures in Wonderland
 Translations of Through the Looking-Glass

Notes

External links
Parodies of Alice in Wonderland an illustrated bibliography

 
Creative works in popular culture